Bolotwa (also spelled Bolotwe, and officially renamed Bholothwa in 2004) is a town in Eastern Cape, South Africa. It is the birthplace of African National Congress leader Robert Resha.

References

Populated places in the Intsika Yethu Local Municipality